The 2006 Hockenheimring GP2 Series round was a GP2 Series motor race held on July 29 and 30, 2006 at the Hockenheimring in Baden-Württemberg, Germany. It was the eighth round of the 2006 GP2 Series season. The race weekend supported the 2006 German Grand Prix.

Classification

Qualifying

Feature race

Sprint race

Notes

References

Hockenheimring
GP2